Irena Bihariová (born 15 September 1980 in Trnava) is a Slovak lawyer and politician. She was the leader of Progressive Slovakia from June 2020 to May 2022. In 2022, a meeting of the Progressive Slovakia party took place, where the only candidate, Michal Šimečka, ran. He was elected chairman of the Party and Irena Bihariová was elected vice-president of the Party.

Life 
She attended Faculty of Law at Comenius University in Bratislava, receiving a master's degree in 2009. Her specials are extremist crimes including cybercrime.

She recognizes herself as Romani, born in an "assimilated family".

References

Progressive Slovakia politicians
Slovak women lawyers
Slovak Romani people
Comenius University alumni
Politicians from Trnava
1980 births

Living people
21st-century Slovak lawyers